Kendi Marisela Rosales Madrid (born 3 April 1990) is a Honduran athlete. She competed in the women's 60 metres at the 2018 IAAF World Indoor Championships.

References

External links

1990 births
Living people
Honduran female sprinters
Place of birth missing (living people)